Dean Harding (born 10 October 1971) is a former Australian rules footballer who played with Fitzroy in the Australian Football League (AFL).

Harding was selected by Fitzroy, from the Wangaratta Rovers, with the 78th overall pick of the 1990 National Draft. He played 12 games for Fitzroy in the 1991 AFL season. His 16 goals that year included four in his club's upset win over the top of the table West Coast Eagles at Princes Park in the final round of the home and away season. He made just two appearances in 1992 and five in 1993.

References

External links
 
 

1971 births
Australian rules footballers from Victoria (Australia)
Fitzroy Football Club players
Wangaratta Rovers Football Club players
Living people